Thomas Raymond Warren -- more commonly known as Ray Warren -- is a former member of the North Carolina House of Representatives, who represented the state's 88th district (including all of Alexander County and part of Catawba County). He was first elected in November 2006 defeating incumbent Republican Mark Hollo, and he served from 2007 until 2011.

Warren is the former sheriff of Alexander County, North Carolina and is a veteran of the United States Army. Warren is a member of the Order of the Long Leaf Pine.

Note that another, unrelated "Ray Warren" (Raymond A. Warren) was also a member of the N.C. House of Representatives, served as a state superior court judge, and ran unsuccessfully for Congress.

Career
Warren served in the U.S Army from 1966 to 1968. in 1978, he was appointed as a Magistrate in Alexander County. In 1979, he began working for the Alexander County Sheriff's Office, where he was appointed an investigator in 1980 and Chief Deputy in 1987. In 1990, he was elected Sheriff of Alexander County, succeeding long time incumbent Thomas Bebber Jr. He was re-elected in 1994 and 1998. In 2002, he didn't seek re-election was sheriff and instead ran for the North Carolina House of Representatives. He was defeated in the general election by incumbent Republican Edgar Starnes. In 2006, he ran for the NC House again and defeated incumbent Republican Mark Hollo, he went on to defeat Hollo in a rematch in the 2008 election. Warren did not seek re-election to the NC House in 2010 and he was succeeded by his predecessor, Mark Hollo.

Electoral history

2008

2006

2002

References

External links
OurCampaigns.com
Official Legislative page
Campaign site

Democratic Party members of the North Carolina House of Representatives
Living people
Year of birth missing (living people)
People from Taylorsville, North Carolina
21st-century American politicians